Rubio's Coastal Grill, formerly known as Rubio's Fresh Mexican Grill and Rubio’s Baja Grill is an American fast casual "Fresh Mex" or "New Mex" restaurant chain specializing in Mexican food, with an emphasis on fish tacos. As of 2013, Rubio's operates, licenses, or franchises more than 200 restaurants in Arizona, California, Florida, Colorado, Nevada, and Utah. It is headquartered in Carlsbad, California.

According to founder Ralph Rubio, he and some friends from San Diego State University were on spring break in San Felipe, Baja California when he first encountered fish tacos at a local stand, and was inspired to open a restaurant serving them in his hometown, San Diego. Since then, the popularity of fish tacos has spread throughout California, although they remain uncommon elsewhere. Rubio's standard fish tacos are made from Alaskan pollock, which is battered, fried, and served in a corn tortilla, although optionally offered with a flour tortilla. Grilled mahi-mahi is also available at all locations.

The first Rubio's restaurant was opened in 1983 at a former Orange Julius site on Mission Bay Drive in the Pacific Beach area of San Diego. The first restaurant offered French fries, calamari, and fish tacos, among other cuisine.

In 2005, a class action lawsuit was brought against the company complaining that the "Lobster Burrito" offered at the restaurant contained squat lobster (also known as Langostino) rather than clawed lobster from the family Nephropidae. Rubio's subsequently changed the name of their product to the "Langostino Lobster Burrito" to avoid future confusion. The burrito is currently only occasionally sold, as a "limited time offer".

On August 24, 2010, Rubio's Restaurants, Inc. announced the closing of its merger with a subsidiary of Mill Road Capital, L.P. to take the company private. Rubio's former stockholders were to receive $8.70 per share in cash in the transaction.

In June 2020, Rubio’s Coastal Grill told Nation's Restaurant News about the closure of all their Florida and Colorado store locations, due to the negative business impact of the coronavirus pandemic. And that they will then focus on their remaining stores in the California, Arizona, and Nevada markets. Rubio's locations in Utah were closed in 2019.

In October 2020, the chain filed for bankruptcy protection.

References

External links

Slashfood.com: Details of Rubio's lawsuit

Fast-food Mexican restaurants
Fast-food chains of the United States
Fast casual restaurants
Regional restaurant chains in the United States
Restaurants in California
Companies based in Carlsbad, California
Restaurants established in 1983
1983 establishments in California
Companies that filed for Chapter 11 bankruptcy in 2020